"Inochi no Ki" is the 19th single released by the Japanese visual kei band, Girugamesh, on October 6, 2010.

Track listing

Personnel
Satoshi – all vocals
Shuu – guitar
Nii – bass
Яyo – drums

References

External links
MySpace.com
Itunes.apple.com

2010 EPs
Girugamesh EPs
Girugamesh songs